George Macovescu (28 May 1913 – 20 March 2002) was a Romanian writer and communist politician who served as the General Secretary of Ministry of Information of Romania and Minister of Foreign Affairs of Romania.

Life and political career
He was born in Joseni, Buzău County. In the 1930s, George Macovescu wrote articles for several left-wing newspapers, such as Adevărul and Dimineața. In 1939, he graduated from the University of Bucharest's Law School. In 1936, he joined the then illegal Communist Party of Romania, and after World War II started, he supported the anti-Nazi forces in German-aligned Romania. Around this time he also married a Jewish wife, Teri Ungar (Tereza).

After the war, Macovescu was the General Secretary of the Ministry of Information of Romania in 1945–1947. He was then appointed Ambassador of Romania to the United Kingdom and served there from 1947 until 1949. After he came back to Bucharest, Macovescu became the magistrate of the Ministry of Foreign Affairs of Romania from 1949 to 1952. He then worked as the Chief Magistrate of the Romanian cinematography from 1955 until 1959. In 1959–1961, he was the Ambassador of Romania to the United States and a member of the Romanian delegation to the United Nations. In 1961, upon his return to Romania, he was appointed the Deputy Minister of Foreign Affairs and in 1967 he became the First Deputy Minister subsequently becoming the Minister of Foreign Affairs on 18 October 1972. As the deputy minister and later minister, he took part in establishing better relations with Israel and tried to increase mediating role of Romania in Israeli–Egyptian conflict. Macovescu served as Minister until 1978. At the time, he was married to his second wife, Emilia Marinela Macovescu.

Macovescu also headed the Writers' Union of Romania from 1978 until 1982. It was in this role in 1979, as a delegate to the XII Romanian Communist Party Congress representing the Writers' Union, that Macovescu rose to discredit a dissident speech by Constantin Pîrvulescu which denounced Nicolae Ceaușescu's leadership as party leader; Macovescu defended Ceaușescu and called on the delegates to "pretend that we didn't even hear what Comrade Pîrvulescu said." From 1949 until 1981, he also taught at Department of Romanian Language and Literature of the University of Bucharest.

He died in Valencia, Spain in 2002.

Writings
Contradicții în Imperiul Britanic, București, 1950 (written under the pen name Victor Duran)
Viața și opera lui Al. Sahia, București, 1950
Gheorghe Lazăr, București, 1954
Unele probleme ale reportajului literar, București, 1956
Oameni și fapte, București, 1957
Introducere în știința literaturii, București, 1962
Vârstele timpului, București, 1971
Catargele înalte, București, 1972
Farmecul pământului, București, 1977
Parfumul amar al pelinului verde. Jurnal la marginea dintre vis și viață, București, 1982
Semnul dintre ochi, București, 1983
Undeva, cândva, București, 1985
Trecânde anotimpuri, București, 1988
Jurnal, Vol. I, Domino, București, 2006

See also
Nicolae Ceaușescu
Foreign relations of Romania

External links
 .

References

1913 births
2002 deaths
People from Buzău County
University of Bucharest alumni
Romanian Ministers of Foreign Affairs
Romanian communists
Romanian opinion journalists
Romanian activist journalists
Adevărul writers
Academic staff of the University of Bucharest
Ambassadors of Romania to the United States
Ambassadors of Romania to the United Kingdom